Traiskirchen is a town in the district of Baden in Lower Austria in Austria. It is 20 km south of Vienna, in the Thermenlinie region, known for its wine and heurigers. Traiskirchen is home to the Traiskirchen Lions basketball team. The town has the oldest public astronomical observatory in Lower Austria. The city is also known for its refugee camp the "Bundesbetreuungsstelle für Asylwerber".

Population

Refugee Camp (Bundesbetreuungsstelle für Asylwerber)

Traiskirchen is home of the largest refugee camp in Austria and one of the largest of these camps in the EU. The refugee camp is based in the centre of Traiskirchen on the area of the former Imperial Artillery Cadet School which was built in 1900. The Traiskirchen Cadet School could accommodate up to 340 cadets, 160 staff and 110 horses (for riding lessons).

During the time of the Allied-occupied Austria, a Soviet army barracks of (about 2,000 Soviet armored troops) and a hospital were housed in the former buildings until the autumn of 1955.

The buildings were first used by the government as a refugee camp between 1956 and 1960. The camp was first used as a shelter for Hungarian refugees, who had left their country as a result of the Hungarian Revolution in November 1956. 113,810 people came to Austria on the 5th of November, and 6,000 were taken to the camp in Traiskirchen. This was the first large use as a refugee camp, and following this it was decided to host further refugees from around the world. On 8 March 1957 the Federal Ministry of the Interior assigned 20 million Schillings (€1.45 million) for the renovation of the  building structures. After the Prague Spring (1968) Czech and Slovak refugees were brought here. In the 1970s and 1980s more refugees – mainly from Eastern Europe, but also from Uganda, Chile, Iran, Iraq and  Vietnam – were accommodated. Many prominent refugees were initially received here, including the later Vienna State Opera Director Ioan Holender and the journalist  Paul Lendvai.

In May 1990 it was announced by the Mayor of Traiskirchen that, in line with the promise by the Minister of the Interior, the institute would be closed permanently. However this plan was rejected, because only a few refugees could be accommodated elsewhere in 1990; also it was expected that accommodation for new refugees from the Soviet Union would be needed in January 1991.

In 1993 the refugee camp was renamed the Asylum Office of the Federal Ministry of the Interior ("Bundesbetreuungsstelle für Asylwerber").

In 2015, as a result of the European migrant crisis, the Asylum Office had to admit an increasing number of illegal immigrants. Following strong criticism from the press and the public, Amnesty International inspected the facility on 6 August 2015.
  
By the end of July 2015 more than 4,500 people were being accommodated. On 5 August, the day before the inspection, the authorities declared a stop to further admissions. Nevertheless at the time of the inspection around 1,500 people were unsheltered, among them more than 500 unattended children and teenagers.

According to the Amnesty report the conditions at the refugee camp were inhumane and unworthy of any human being: lack of staff and translators, lack of organization, food supply problems (two hours wait), terrible sanitary conditions, no separate sections for women and men, and a point system for punishment for fighting but also for complaints, resulting in spending several nights outside the facility.

Issues
Traiskirchen refugee camp is frequently subject to political and media debate in Austria. Refugees' poor living conditions have been criticized, and the inmates have been associated with drug dealing, theft and  violent crime. The police are often accused of conducting semi-legal actions in raids both inside and outside the camp.

In 2003 Interior Minister Ernst Strasser outsourced the camp to the German company European Home Care. This (criticized) contract was cancelled by the company in 2010 because of low occupancy.

Education

Kindergarten
    
 Kindergarten Möllersdorf Pestalozzi-Gasse
 Kindergarten Möllesdorf Schlössl
 Kindergarten Traiskirchen Bärenhöhle
 Kindergarten Traiskirchen Biberburg
 Kindergarten Traiskirchen Alfons Petzold
 Kindergarten Tribuswinkel Schloss
 Kindergarten Tribuswinkel Badner Straße
 Kindergarten Wienersdorf 
 Oeynhausen Pfarrkindergarten from the church

Schools

Primary school

 Volksschule Möllersdorf
 Volksschule Tribuswinkel
 Volksschule Traiskirchen
The primary school in Traiskirchen is encircled by a fence for security purposes.

Secondary school
 Sport Middleschool Traiskirchen

School for disabled pupils  
  Traiskirchen

Police education school

The "Bildungszentrum der Sicherheitsexekutive (BZS)" Traiskirchen is an education institution for the Austrian police.

Issues
The percentage of foreigners in the secondary and primary schools sometimes exceeds 70% and is often discussed in the public. Traiskirchen has no highschool or college for higher education.

Sights

Franz-Koller Observatory
This observatory is the oldest in the state of Lower Austria and has been open to the public since 1967. It is unlike many observatories due to its location in the middle of the city and its low elevation, making it susceptible to the winter fog that plagues the region.

St. Nicholas Church
This church is notable for its age. It was built around the year 1400.

St. Margaret Church
The church was rebuilt in 1683 after the siege of Vienna based on its gothic foundations.

Lutheran Church
The church was built 1913.

The Geldscheisser
The famous "Geldscheisser" is located in the city centre.

Malt Factory
The malt factory was owned by the banker Max Mauthner (born 22. Juli 1838 in Prague, † 28. Dezember 1904 in Vienna).

Castle of Moellersdorf
The castle was erected about 1690–1700 from Thomas Zachäus Czernin von und zu Chudenitz. About 1780 Joseph II dedicated the facility to a casern.

Castle of Tribuswinkel
The founding is dated 1136, but earlier resourcers refer to 1120. 

The weir would probably have been built as surrounding water castle around 1120-1230. The wall surrounding the castle and the moult is not existing anymore.

Basketball
The town is home to the Traiskirchen Lions, 3-time Champion of the Österreichische Basketball Bundesliga. The team plays its home games in the Lions Dome.

People 
 Joseph Fendi, the father of the painter Peter Fendi came from Traiskirchen
 Hans Seischab (1898-1965), professor of Business Administration
 Hellmuth Swietelsky (1905-1995), businessman and founder of a construction company
 Franz Kroller (1923-2000), director of the University Library Graz
 Otto Vogl (1927-2013), chemist
 Harald Neudorfer (born 1962), professor of propulsion technology

References

External links

Official Traiskirchen website

Cities and towns in Baden District, Austria
Baden District, Austria